Mark Gerald Place (born 16 November 1969) is an English former professional footballer who played in the Football League for Doncaster Rovers and Mansfield Town.

References

1969 births
Living people
English footballers
Association football defenders
English Football League players
Mansfield Town F.C. players
Doncaster Rovers F.C. players
Eastwood Town F.C. players
Hucknall Town F.C. players